Variations on a Theme may refer to:
 Variations on a Theme of Frank Bridge
 Carmen Variations (Horowitz), subtitled "Variations on a Theme from Carmen"
 Variations on a Theme of Chopin (Mompou)
 Variations on a Theme of Chopin (Rachmaninoff)
 Variations on a Theme of Corelli
 Variations and Fugue on a Theme by Handel
 Variations on a Theme by Haydn
 Variations and Fugue on a Theme by Hiller
 Variations and Fugue on a Theme by Mozart
 Introduction and Variations on a Theme by Mozart (Sor)
 Variations and Fugue on a Theme of Purcell, subtitled The Young Person's Guide to the Orchestra
 Variations, Interlude and Finale on a Theme by Rameau
 Variations on a Theme by Tchaikovsky (Arensky)
 Variations on a Theme by William Carlos Williams, a poem by Kenneth Koch
 Variations on a Theme (Om album)
 Variations on a Theme (David Thomas album)
 Variations on a Theme Publishing
 Variation on a Theme (play), a 1958 work by the British writer Terence Rattigan

Variations may refer to:
Orchestral Variations (Copland)
Piano Variations (Copland)
Variation on a Waltz by Diabelli (Liszt)
Variations for Winds, Strings and Keyboards
Enigma Variations, subtitled "Variations on an Original Theme for Orchestra"
Variations for piano (Webern)
Variations (Stravinsky)
Variations (ballet)
Variations for Orchestra (Balanchine)

See also
 
 List of variations on a theme by another composer
 Variation (music)
 Variation (disambiguation)
 Variations for Orchestra (disambiguation)
 Symphonic Variations (disambiguation)